Wells Fargo Center is a skyscraper located in Downtown, Salt Lake City, Utah, United States.

History
The American Stores Tower was originally built as the corporate headquarters for American Stores (owners of Sav-on, Osco, Jewel grocery/pharmacy stores.)  Shortly after completion, the company was acquired by Albertsons on August 3, 1998, and the building became known as the Delta Tower shortly thereafter.  When Albertsons decided to move operations to the Hardware Building on 400 West near North Temple, the building was purchased by Wasatch Property Management, and renamed the building Wells Fargo Center. The building was the headquarters of the Salt Lake Organizing Committee (SLOC) leading up to the 2002 Winter Olympics. Wells Fargo currently occupies numerous floors within the building, as do many of Salt Lake's premiere law firms.

Details

 Architect - HKS Architects
 It has 13 elevators
 Building use - office, commercial
 Structural type - highrise
 Architectural style - postmodern
 Materials - glass and Cold Springs salt and pepper granite
 Two helipads on the roof make the American Stores Heliport (UT31)
 KUTV is housed in the building

See also
List of tallest buildings by U.S. state
List of tallest buildings in Salt Lake City

References

External links

1998 establishments in Utah
Office buildings completed in 1998
Skyscraper office buildings in Salt Lake City
Wells Fargo buildings